Karl Robinson (born 13 September 1980) is an English professional football manager and former player.

Playing career
Robinson was born in Rainhill, Merseyside. He played for Caernarfon Town, Bamber Bridge, Marine, Oswestry Town, Rhyl, Kidsgrove Athletic, Prescot Cables, St Helens Town, Alsager Town and Warrington Town.

Style of play
Robinson played as a striker, being described as a "big, powerful centre forward", and later in his career played as a midfielder.

Coaching and management career
Robinson coached at the Liverpool youth academy and later worked as a coach at Blackburn Rovers.

Milton Keynes Dons
He was appointed manager of League One club Milton Keynes Dons on 10 May 2010, having previously been the club's assistant manager under previous boss Paul Ince. At 29 years of age, he was the youngest manager at the time in the Football League and former England coach John Gorman was named his number two.

In the 2010–11 season, his first season in charge, Robinson guided MK Dons to 5th place in League One. This was regarded as a good achievement, improving on the Dons' points total over the previous season. The team lost in the play-offs to Peterborough United over two legs.

In the 2011–12 season, he continued making impressive strides, attracting big-name players and guiding his side to another 5th-place finish and was again in the play-offs. During the season, he signed a three-year contract extension.

In 2014–15, Robinson masterminded arguably MK Dons' greatest victory, a 4–0 EFL Cup win over Manchester United, as well as leading the Dons to promotion to the Championship for the first time when they finished as runners-up in League One.

On 20 July 2015, Robinson signed a contract extension alongside the club's Head of Coaching, Richie Barker, though MK Dons did not publicise the length of either deal. Robinson's MK Dons suffered relegation from the Championship during the 2015–16 season, finishing in 23rd position.

On 23 May 2016, it was revealed that Robinson had turned down an offer from Massimo Cellino to become Leeds United's Head Coach. In October 2016, he was relieved of his duties following a 3–0 defeat to Southend United the previous day, which took the club's winless run to four games.

Charlton Athletic
Robinson was named the new Charlton Athletic manager on 24 November 2016 following the sacking of Russell Slade, taking full charge of the club from Monday 28 November. He departed by mutual consent in March 2018.

Oxford United
On 22 March 2018, Robinson was appointed as the new head coach of League One club Oxford United, joining on the same day as his departure from Charlton Athletic. He signed a two-and-a-half-year contract, extended to 2022 in August 2019. In his first season in charge, Oxford finished in 12th place.
 
In December 2019, Robinson was charged by the Football Association for using abusive language to a match official. Oxford were adjudged to have finished the COVID-affected 2019–20 season in 4th place in the League on average points per game; they reached the play-off final but lost 2–1 to Wycombe Wanderers. The following  season Oxford again reached the play-off places, finishing 6th in League One before losing to Blackpool in the first round of the playoffs 6–3 on aggregate. 

On 26 February 2023, Robinson was sacked by the club following a run of eight games without a win, his last match in charge being a 3–0 home defeat to Bristol Rovers the previous day.

Managerial statistics

Honours

As a manager
Milton Keynes Dons
Football League One runners-up: 2014–15

Individual
Football League One Manager of the Month: August 2011, January 2015, April 2015

References

1980 births
Living people
Footballers from Liverpool
English footballers
Association football midfielders
Association football forwards
Caernarfon Town F.C. players
Marine F.C. players
Bamber Bridge F.C. players
Oswestry Town F.C. players
Rhyl F.C. players
Kidsgrove Athletic F.C. players
Prescot Cables F.C. players
St Helens Town A.F.C. players
Alsager Town F.C. players
Warrington Town F.C. players
Cymru Premier players
English football managers
Milton Keynes Dons F.C. managers
Charlton Athletic F.C. managers
Oxford United F.C. managers
English Football League managers
Liverpool F.C. non-playing staff
Blackburn Rovers F.C. non-playing staff
Association football coaches